Patricia Adams may refer to:

Patricia J. Adams (born 1952), Anguillan writer
Patricia Emily Adams, South African politician
Pat Adams (born 1928), American painter and printmaker
Patricia Adams (musician) with Ray Santisi
Patricia Adams, executive director of Probe International, see Odious debt

See also
Pat Adams (disambiguation)